Troy Jollimore is a poet, philosopher, and literary critic.

Career and education

Troy Jollimore was born in 1971 in Liverpool, Nova Scotia and attended the University of King's College in Halifax, Nova Scotia. He earned his Ph.D. in Philosophy from Princeton University in 1999, under the direction of Harry Frankfurt and Gilbert Harman. He has lived in the U.S. since 1993 and is currently Professor of Philosophy at California State University, Chico. He has been an External Faculty Fellow at the Stanford Humanities Center (2006–07), the Stanley P. Young Fellow in Poetry at the Bread Loaf Writers' Conference (2012), and a Guggenheim Fellow (2013).

Jollimore's philosophical writings frequently concern ethical issues connected to personal relationships. His first book, Friendship and Agent-Relative Morality, was published in 2001; his second, Love's Vision, appeared in 2011, and his third, On Loyalty, in 2012. Many of his papers explore issues in the philosophy of friendship and romantic love. He has also published on topics including the ethics of terrorism, the depiction of evil in literature, the nature of happiness, the existence of so-called "admirable immorality," and aesthetic issues in philosophy of poetry and philosophy of dance.

His first collection of poetry, Tom Thomson in Purgatory, won the National Book Critics Circle award for poetry in 2006. In an interview with the Los Angeles Review Of Books, Jollimore says of that book, "I don’t plan what I’m going to write; I discover it by writing it.".   The book was also nominated for the 2007 Poets' Prize.

His second collection, At Lake Scugog, appeared in 2011 in Princeton University Press's Princeton Series of Contemporary Poets, which has published all of his subsequent poetry books. His third collection, Syllabus of Errors, was selected by the New York Times as one of the "Best Poetry Books of 2015."

His most recent book, Earthly Delights, was published in 2021. The poet Forrest Gander called it an “engaging and unusual book” that “mixes humor, philosophy, [and] political ire,” and remarked that “Jollimore’s riveting language is both familiar and uncanny, somehow as lean and precise as it is lexically rich.”

Jollimore's poems have appeared in publications including The New Yorker, The Believer, McSweeney's, and Poetry. He is also a frequent book reviewer, writing for the Washington Post, the Chicago Tribune, the San Francisco Chronicle, and the New York Times Book Review, among others.

Views
In Love's Vision and in several papers published since Jollimore defends the view that we have reasons for loving the people we love, while allowing that love has significant non-rational elements and that our reasons do not completely determine whom we love. He defends the "Vision View" of love, which claims that love has many of the features of perception, and that an understanding of these features can solve common philosophical puzzles that arise in connection with love.

Papers published since Love's Vision explore themes of autonomy, identity, and anxiety in the contexts of romantic love and friendship.

Jollimore frequently discusses contemporary cinema in his work, and has published papers on philosophical issues found in such films as Eternal Sunshine of the Spotless Mind, The Big Lebowski, Her, Rear Window, and Vertigo.

Books

Poetry collections 
 
  (chapbook)

Philosophy

References

External links

Troy Jollimore's website
Guggenheim Foundation website
New York Times "Best Poetry Books of 2015"
Author info page on Poets & Writers site
San Francisco Chronicle review of Tom Thomson in Purgatory by John Freeman
New York Times Book Review review of Tom Thomson in Purgatory by James Longenbach
Publishers Weekly review of At Lake Scugog
ForeWord review of At Lake Scugog by Jennifer Sperry Steinorth
Review of Love's Vision at 'Philosophy in Review'
"On the Origins of Things" (poem)
"The Solipsist" (poem)

Living people
Analytic philosophers
Princeton University alumni
California State University, Chico faculty
20th-century American philosophers
21st-century American philosophers
Canadian expatriate writers in the United States
University of King's College alumni
American literary critics
People from Chico, California
American ethicists
21st-century American poets
21st-century Canadian poets
Poets from California
Formalist poets
Writers from Nova Scotia
Canadian philosophers
Canadian male poets
Year of birth missing (living people)
Journalists from California
21st-century Canadian male writers
21st-century American essayists
Canadian male non-fiction writers